Bruce Nichols (born December 31, 1955) is a former professional tennis player from the United States.

Career
Nichols, of UCLA, partnered with John Austin to win the NCAA Division One doubles championship in 1978. He competed in the main singles draw of the US Open three times, for one win, over Tom Gorman in 1978. In the doubles, Nichols (with David Graham) made the third round of the US Open in 1981 and narrowly missed out on a spot in the quarter-finals, losing to John Newcombe and Fred Stolle in five sets. It was in doubles that he had most of his success on tour, winning the Lagos Open in 1980 and finishing runner-up at both South Orange and Bogota the previous year.

Grand Prix career finals

Doubles: 3 (1–2)

Challenger titles

Doubles: (2)

References

1955 births
Living people
American male tennis players
UCLA Bruins men's tennis players